The 2019 UConn Huskies football team represented the University of Connecticut (UConn) during the 2019 NCAA Division I FBS football season. The Huskies were led by head coach Randy Edsall, who was in the third year of his second stint as head coach at the school. The team played their home games at Rentschler Field in East Hartford, Connecticut, and competed as members of the East Division of the American Athletic Conference. They finished the season 2–10, 0–8 in AAC play to finish in last place in the East Division. The 2019 season was the Huskies' last as members of the American Athletic Conference.

Preseason

Coaching changes
In January 2019, head coach Randy Edsall announced the hiring of Lou Spanos to be the new defensive coordinator, replacing the fired Billy Crocker. Spanos had spent the 2018 season as an analyst at Alabama. In February, offensive coordinator John Dunn unexpectedly left to join the staff of the New York Jets. Offensive line coach Frank Giufre was promoted to become the new offensive coordinator.

Personnel changes
On July 30, 2019, it was announced that linebacker Eli Thomas was retiring from football after suffering a stroke.

AAC media poll
The AAC media poll was released on July 16, 2019, with the Huskies predicted to finish sixth in the AAC East Division, receiving all last place votes.

Schedule
UConn's 2019 schedule began with three non-conference games: at home against Wagner of the Northeast Conference, at home against Illinois of the Big Ten Conference, and on the road against Indiana, also of the Big Ten Conference. Their fourth non-conference game came mid-season against rival UMass, a football independent. In American Athletic Conference play, the Huskies played the other members of the East Division and draw Houston, Navy, and Tulane from the West Division. They did not play Memphis, SMU, or Tulsa as part of the regular season.

Source:

Roster

Game summaries

Wagner

Illinois

Indiana

UCF

South Florida

Tulane

Houston

UMass

Navy

Cincinnati

East Carolina

Temple

Players drafted into the NFL

References

UConn
UConn Huskies football seasons
UConn Huskies football